Paul Klein may refer to:

Paul Klein (missionary) (1652–1717), Czech Jesuit missionary in the Philippines, pharmacist and Cavite College rector, often referred to as Pablo Clain, or Paulus or Pavel Klein
Paul L. Klein (1929–98), developer of pay-per-view TV channels and creator of the least objectionable program theory
Paul Klein (chess player) (1915–1992), German–Ecuadorian chess player
Paul Klein (art dealer) (1946–2020), American art activist from Chicago
Paul Klein, a musical theatre composer who collaborated with the lyricist Fred Ebb

See also
Paul Kline (1937–1999), psychologist
Paul Kline (photographer) (born 1964), American photographer